Tequila is an album recorded by the jazz guitarist Wes Montgomery, released in 1966.

History
Tequila is a mixture of tracks using just a jazz quartet with Ron Carter, Grady Tate and Ray Barretto and the rest with a string section arranged by Claus Ogerman. It is mainly a Latin-flavored album, the first Montgomery recorded without a keyboardist.

It was reissued on CD in 1999 and 2008 with alternate takes that are listed below.

Reception 

In his AllMusic review, Scott Yanow singled out individual tracks as those giving Montgomery the opportunity to jam and those backed with string arrangements. The few tracks he praises he claims "uplift this album quite a bit beyond the guitarist's later A&M recordings."

Jazz writer Josef Woodard called the album "an airy, melodious record, with the standout track being the gently brooding Montgomery original 'Bumpin' on Sunset', which features him playing double octaves-the same note played in three octaves."

Track listing 
"Tequila" (Chuck Rio)
"Little Child (Daddy Dear)" (Wayne Shanklin)
"What the World Needs Now Is Love" (Burt Bacharach, Hal David)
"The Big Hurt" (Wayne Shanklin)
"Bumpin' on Sunset" (Wes Montgomery)
"Insensatez (How Insensitive)" (Vinicius De Moraes, Norman Gimbel, Antônio Carlos Jobim)
"The Thumb" (Wes Montgomery)
"Midnight Mood" (Ben Raleigh, Joe Zawinul)
"Wives and Lovers" (Burt Bacharach, Hal David)
"Tequila (alternate take)"
"The Big Hurt (alternate take)"
"Bumpin' on Sunset (alternate take)"

Personnel
Wes Montgomery – guitar
Ron Carter – bass
Grady Tate – drums
Ray Barretto – conga
George Devens – vibraphone
Bernard Eichen – violin
Arnold Eidus – violin
Paul Gershman – violin
Emanuel Green – violin
Julius Held – violin
Gene Orloff – violin
Harry Lookofsky – violin
Joseph Malin – violin
Abe Kessler – cello
Charles McCracken – cello
George Ricci – cello
Harvey Shapiro – cello
Production notes:
Creed Taylor – producer
Claus Ogerman – arranger, conductor
Rudy Van Gelder – engineer

References

1966 albums
Wes Montgomery albums
Albums produced by Creed Taylor
Verve Records albums
Albums recorded at Van Gelder Studio
Albums conducted by Claus Ogerman
Albums arranged by Claus Ogerman